Bora Chung (born 1976) is a South Korean writer and translator. Her collection of short stories, Cursed Bunny, was shortlisted for the 2022 International Booker Prize.

Life and career 
Bora Chung was born in 1976, in Seoul. Her parents were dentists. She completed graduate studies in Russian and East European area studies at Yale University, then went on to gain a PhD in Slavic literature from Indiana University. She taught the Russian language, literature and science fiction studies at Yonsei University. She is a social activist.

Chung has written three novels and three collections of short stories. She lists as her literary influences the works of Park Wan-suh, Bruno Schulz, Bruno Jasieński, Andrei Platonov and Lyudmila Petrushevskaya, as well as Samguk yusa folktales. In 1998, she won a Yonsei Literature Prize for her short story "The Head". She is also a recipient of second prizes at the Digital Literature Awards (2008) and Gwacheon Science Center SF Awards (2014).

In 2022, the English edition of her short story collection Cursed Bunny translated by Anton Hur was shortlisted for the International Booker Prize. The ten stories borrow from different genres, including magical realism, horror and science fiction.

Chung translates contemporary prose from Russian and Polish into Korean.

References 

21st-century South Korean women writers
1976 births

Living people
South Korean women short story writers
Yale Graduate School of Arts and Sciences alumni
Indiana University alumni
21st-century South Korean writers
Academic staff of Yonsei University
South Korean translators
Translators from Polish
Translators from Russian